Luke Duffy (born 21 January 1980) is a former professional rugby league footballer who played for the Wests Tigers.

External links
RLP Profile

1980 births
Living people
Australian rugby league players
Rugby league wingers
Wests Tigers players
Place of birth missing (living people)